Jean Scott (born 14 March 1994) is a Costa Rican footballer who last played as a forward for Sporting San Jose.

Career
Scott enjoyed a close relationship with the Uruguayan football manager Orlando de León who gave him his first chances in football at Herediano in 2013 and whom he also joined in 2016 at Liberia. Scott joined Guadalupe F.C. in January 2019. After joining Sporting F.C. Scott was named in the league team of the season at the end of the 2019-20 campaign as his club finished top of the Segunda División de Costa Rica.

International career
Scott made his debut for the senior Costa Rica national team at the Avaya Stadium on 2 February 2019 against the USMNT.

References

1994 births
Living people
Costa Rican footballers
Association football forwards
Costa Rica international footballers
Guadalupe F.C. players